Count of Villacieros is a hereditary title in the Peerage of Spain, granted in 1980 by Juan Carlos I to Antonio Villacieros, Spanish Ambassador and Chief of Protocol of the Royal Household of Spain.

Counts of Villacieros (1980)

 Antonio Villacieros y Benito, 1st Count of Villacieros (1900-1983)
 Francisco Javier Villacieros y Machimbarrena, 2nd Count of Villacieros (1928-2016), eldest son of the 1st Count
 Álvaro Villacieros y Zunzunegui, 3rd Count of Villacieros (b. 1955), only son of the 2nd Count

See also
Spanish transition to democracy
Spanish nobility

References

Bibliography
 

Counts of Spain